Abacetus obscurus is a species of ground beetle in the subfamily Pterostichinae. It was described by Andrewes in 1933.

References

obscurus
Beetles described in 1933